John Wellesley Magee (born 1848) was a second class fireman serving in the United States Navy who received the Medal of Honor for bravery.

Biography
Magee was born in 1848 in Washington, D.C., and enlisted in the Navy from Maryland in 1867. Just before midnight August 21, 1884 the  collided with the schooner James S. Lowell about five miles from Vineyard Haven, Massachusetts and started to sink. Magee remained at his post in the fireroom until the fires were put out by the rising waters. For his actions on that night he received the Medal October 18, 1884.

Medal of Honor citation
Rank and organization: Second Class Fireman, U.S. Navy. Born: 1859, Maryland. Accredited to: Maryland. G.O. No.: 326, 18 October 1884.

Citation:

Serving on board the U.S.S. Tallapoosa during the sinking of that vessel on the night of 21 August 1884. During this period, Magee remained at his post of duty in the fireroom until the fires were put out by the rising waters.

See also

List of Medal of Honor recipients during Peacetime

References

External links

1848 births
Year of death missing
United States Navy Medal of Honor recipients
United States Navy sailors
People from Maryland
Non-combat recipients of the Medal of Honor